

Events

Pre-1600
1479 BC – Thutmose III ascends to the throne of Egypt, although power effectively shifts to Hatshepsut (according to the Low Chronology of the 18th dynasty).
1183 BC – Traditional reckoning of the Fall of Troy marking the end of the legendary Trojan War, given by chief librarian of the Library of Alexandria Eratosthenes, among others.
1547 – Battle of Mühlberg. Duke of Alba, commanding Spanish-Imperial forces of Charles I of Spain, defeats the troops of Schmalkaldic League.
1558 – Mary, Queen of Scots, marries the Dauphin of France, François, at Notre Dame de Paris.

1601–1900
1704 – The first regular newspaper in British Colonial America, The Boston News-Letter, is published.
1793 – French revolutionary Jean-Paul Marat is acquitted by the Revolutionary Tribunal of charges brought by the Girondin in Paris.
1800 – The United States Library of Congress is established when President John Adams signs legislation to appropriate $5,000 to purchase "such books as may be necessary for the use of Congress".
1837 – The great fire in Surat city of India caused more than 500 deaths and destruction of more than 9000 houses.
1877 – Russo-Turkish War: Russian Empire declares war on Ottoman Empire.
1885 – American sharpshooter Annie Oakley is hired by Nate Salsbury to be a part of Buffalo Bill's Wild West.
1895 – Joshua Slocum, the first person to sail single-handedly around the world, sets sail from Boston, Massachusetts aboard the sloop "Spray".

1901–present
1913 – The Woolworth Building, a skyscraper in New York City, is opened.
1914 – The Franck–Hertz experiment, a pillar of quantum mechanics, is presented to the German Physical Society.
1915 – The arrest of 250 Armenian intellectuals and community leaders in Istanbul marks the beginning of the Armenian genocide.
1916 – Easter Rising: Irish rebels, led by Patrick Pearse and James Connolly, launch an uprising in Dublin against British rule and proclaim an Irish Republic.
  1916   – Ernest Shackleton and five men of the Imperial Trans-Antarctic Expedition launch a lifeboat from uninhabited Elephant Island in the Southern Ocean to organise a rescue for the crew of the sunken .
1918 – World War I: First tank-to-tank combat, during the second Battle of Villers-Bretonneux. Three British Mark IVs meet three German A7Vs.
1922 – The first segment of the Imperial Wireless Chain providing wireless telegraphy between Leafield in Oxfordshire, England, and Cairo, Egypt, comes into operation.
1924 – Thorvald Stauning becomes premier of Denmark (first term).
1926 – The Treaty of Berlin is signed. Germany and the Soviet Union each pledge neutrality in the event of an attack on the other by a third party for the next five years.
1932 – Benny Rothman leads the mass trespass of Kinder Scout, leading to substantial legal reforms in the United Kingdom.
1933 – Nazi Germany begins its persecution of Jehovah's Witnesses by shutting down the Watch Tower Society office in Magdeburg.
1944 – World War II: The SBS launches a raid against the garrison of Santorini in Greece.
1953 – Winston Churchill is knighted by Queen Elizabeth II.
1955 – The Bandung Conference ends: Twenty-nine non-aligned nations of Asia and Africa finish a meeting that condemns colonialism, racism, and the Cold War.
1957 – Suez Crisis: The Suez Canal is reopened following the introduction of UNEF peacekeepers to the region.
1963 – Marriage of Princess Alexandra of Kent to Angus Ogilvy at Westminster Abbey in London.
1965 – Civil war breaks out in the Dominican Republic when Colonel Francisco Caamaño overthrows the triumvirate that had been in power since the coup d'état against Juan Bosch.
1967 – Cosmonaut Vladimir Komarov dies in Soyuz 1 when its parachute fails to open. He is the first human to die during a space mission.
  1967   – Vietnam War: American General William Westmoreland says in a news conference that the enemy had "gained support in the United States that gives him hope that he can win politically that which he cannot win militarily".
1970 – China launches Dong Fang Hong I, becoming the fifth nation to put an object into orbit using its own booster.
  1970   – The Gambia becomes a republic within the Commonwealth of Nations, with Dawda Jawara as its first President.
1980 – Eight U.S. servicemen die in Operation Eagle Claw as they attempt to end the Iran hostage crisis.
1990 – STS-31: The Hubble Space Telescope is launched from the Space Shuttle Discovery.
  1990   – Gruinard Island, Scotland, is officially declared free of the anthrax disease after 48 years of quarantine.
1993 – An IRA bomb devastates the Bishopsgate area of London.
1996 – In the United States, the Antiterrorism and Effective Death Penalty Act of 1996 is passed into law.
2004 – The United States lifts economic sanctions imposed on Libya 18 years previously, as a reward for its cooperation in eliminating weapons of mass destruction.
2005 – Cardinal Joseph Ratzinger is inaugurated as the 265th Pope of the Catholic Church taking the name Pope Benedict XVI.
2011 – WikiLeaks starts  publishing the Guantanamo Bay files leak.
2013 – A building collapses near Dhaka, Bangladesh, killing 1,129 people and injuring 2,500 others.
  2013   – Violence in Bachu County, Kashgar Prefecture, of China's Xinjiang results in death of 21 people.

Births

Pre-1600
1086 – Ramiro II of Aragon (d. 1157)
1492 – Sabina of Bavaria, Bavarian duchess and noblewoman (d. 1564)
1532 – Thomas Lucy, English politician (d. 1600)
1533 – William I of Orange, founding father of the Netherlands (d. 1584)
1538 – Guglielmo Gonzaga, Duke of Mantua (d. 1587)
1545 – Henry Wriothesley, 2nd Earl of Southampton, English Earl (d. 1581)
1562 – Xu Guangqi, Ming Dynasty Chinese politician, scholar and lay Catholic leader (d. 1633)
1581 – Vincent de Paul, French priest and saint (d. 1660)

1601–1900
1608 – Gaston, Duke of Orléans, third son of King Henry IV of France (d. 1660)
1620 – John Graunt, English demographer and statistician (d. 1674)
1706 – Giovanni Battista Martini, Italian pianist and composer (d. 1780)
1718 – Nathaniel Hone the Elder, Irish-English painter and educator (d. 1784)
1743 – Edmund Cartwright, English clergyman and engineer, invented the power loom (d. 1823)
1784 – Peter Vivian Daniel, American lawyer and jurist (d. 1860)
1815 – Anthony Trollope, English novelist, essayist, and short story writer (d. 1882)
1823 – Sebastián Lerdo de Tejada, Mexican politician, President of Mexico (d. 1889)
1845 – Carl Spitteler, Swiss poet and author, Nobel Prize laureate (d. 1924)
1856 – Philippe Pétain, French general and politician, 119th Prime Minister of France (d. 1951)
1860 – Queen Marau, last Queen of Tahiti (d.1935) 
1862 – Tomitaro Makino, Japanese botanist (d. 1957)
1868 – Sandy Herd, Scottish golfer (d. 1944)
1876 – Erich Raeder, German admiral (d. 1960)
1878 – Jean Crotti, Swiss-French painter (d. 1958)
1879 – Susanna Bokoyni, Hungarian-American circus performer (d. 1984)
1880 – Gideon Sundback, Swedish-American engineer and businessman, developed the zipper (d. 1954)
  1880   – Josef Müller, Croatian entomologist (d. 1964)
1882 – Hugh Dowding, 1st Baron Dowding, Scottish-English air marshal (d. 1970)
1885 – Thomas Cronan, American triple jumper (d. 1962)
  1885   – Con Walsh, Irish-Canadian hammer thrower and footballer (d. 1961)
1887 – Denys Finch Hatton, English hunter (d. 1931)
1888 – Pe Maung Tin, Burma-based scholar and educator (d. 1973)
1889 – Stafford Cripps, English academic and politician, Chancellor of the Exchequer (d. 1952)
  1889   – Lyubov Popova, Russian painter and academic (d. 1924)
1897 – Manuel Ávila Camacho, Mexican colonel and politician, 45th President of Mexico (d. 1955)
  1897   – Benjamin Lee Whorf, American linguist, anthropologist, and engineer (d. 1941)
1899 – Oscar Zariski, Russian-American mathematician and academic (d. 1986)
1900 – Elizabeth Goudge, English author and educator (d. 1984)

1901–present
1903 – José Antonio Primo de Rivera, Spanish lawyer and politician, founded the Falange (d. 1936)
1904 – Willem de Kooning, Dutch-American painter and educator (d. 1997)
1905 – Al Bates, American long jumper (d. 1999)
  1905   – Robert Penn Warren, American novelist, poet, and literary critic (d. 1989)
1906 – William Joyce, American-born Irish-British Nazi propaganda broadcaster (d. 1946)
  1906   – Mimi Smith, English nurse (d. 1991)
1907 – Gabriel Figueroa, Mexican cinematographer (d. 1997)
1908 – Marceline Day, American actress (d. 2000)
  1908   – Inga Gentzel, Swedish runner (d. 1991)
  1908   – Józef Gosławski, Polish sculptor (d. 1963)
1912 – Ruth Osburn, American discus thrower (d. 1994)
1913 – Dieter Grau, German-American scientist and engineer (d. 2014)
1914 – William Castle, American director, producer, and screenwriter (d. 1977)
  1914   – Phil Watson, Canadian ice hockey player and coach (d. 1991)
  1914   – Justin Wilson, American chef and author (d. 2001)
1916 – Lou Thesz, American wrestler and trainer (d. 2002)
1919 – David Blackwell, American mathematician and academic (d. 2010)
  1919   – Glafcos Clerides, Cypriot lawyer and politician, 4th President of Cyprus (d. 2013)
1920 – Gino Valenzano, Italian race car driver (d. 2011)
1922 – Marc-Adélard Tremblay, Canadian anthropologist and academic (d. 2014)
1923 – Gus Bodnar, Canadian ice hockey player and coach (d. 2005)
  1923   – Doris Burn, American author and illustrator (d. 2011)
1924 – Clement Freud, German-English radio host, academic, and politician (d. 2009)
  1924   – Ruth Kobart, American actress and singer (d. 2002)
1925 – Franco Leccese, Italian sprinter (d. 1992)
1926 – Marilyn Erskine, American actress
  1926   – Thorbjörn Fälldin, Swedish farmer and politician, 27th Prime Minister of Sweden (d. 2016)
1927 – Josy Barthel, Luxembourgian runner and politician, Luxembourgian Minister for Energy (d. 1992) 
1928 – Tommy Docherty, Scottish footballer and manager  (d. 2020)
  1928   – Johnny Griffin, American saxophonist (d. 2008)
 1928    – Anahit Perikhanian, Russian-born Armenian Iranologist (d. 2012)
1929 – Dr. Rajkumar, Indian actor and singer (d. 2006)
1930 – Jerome Callet, American instrument designer, educator, and author (d. 2019)
  1930   – Richard Donner, American actor, director, and producer (d. 2021)
  1930   – José Sarney, Brazilian lawyer and politician, 31st President of Brazil
1931 – Abdelhamid Kermali, Algerian footballer and manager (d. 2013)
  1931   – Bridget Riley, English painter and illustrator
1934 – Jayakanthan, Indian journalist and author (d. 2015)
  1934   – Shirley MacLaine, American actress, singer, and dancer
1936 – David Crombie, Canadian educator and politician, 56th Mayor of Toronto
  1936   – Jill Ireland, English actress (d. 1990)
1937 – Joe Henderson, American saxophonist and composer (d. 2001)
1940 – Sue Grafton, American author (d. 2017)
1941 – Richard Holbrooke, American journalist, banker, and diplomat, 22nd United States Ambassador to the United Nations (d. 2010)
  1941   – John Williams, Australian-English guitarist and composer
1942 – Richard M. Daley, American lawyer and politician, 54th Mayor of Chicago
  1942   – Barbra Streisand, American singer, actress, activist, and producer
1943 – Richard Sterban, American country and gospel bass singer 
  1943   – Gordon West, English footballer (d. 2012)
1944 – Peter Cresswell, English judge
  1944   – Maarja Nummert, Estonian architect
  1944   – Tony Visconti, American record producer, musician and singer
1945 – Doug Clifford, American drummer and songwriter
1946 – Doug Christie, Canadian lawyer and activist (d. 2013)
1947 – Josep Borrell, Spanish engineer and politician, 22nd President of the European Parliament
  1947   – João Braz de Aviz, Brazilian cardinal
  1947   – Claude Dubois, Canadian singer-songwriter and guitarist
  1947   – Denise Kingsmill, Baroness Kingsmill, New Zealand-English lawyer and politician
  1947   – Roger D. Kornberg, American biochemist and academic, Nobel Prize laureate
1948 – Paul Cellucci, American soldier and politician, 69th Governor of Massachusetts (d. 2013)
  1948   – Eliana Gil, Ecuadorian-American psychiatrist, therapist, and author
1949 – Eddie Hart, American sprinter
  1949   – Véronique Sanson, French singer-songwriter and producer
1950 – Rob Hyman, American singer-songwriter and musician
1951 – Ron Arad, Israeli architect and academic
  1951   – Christian Bobin, French author and poet
  1951   – Nigel Harrison, English bass player and songwriter 
  1951   – Enda Kenny, Irish educator and politician, 13th Taoiseach of Ireland
1952 – Jean Paul Gaultier, French fashion designer
  1952   – Ralph Winter, American film producer
1953 – Eric Bogosian, American actor and writer
1954 – Mumia Abu-Jamal, American journalist, activist, and convicted murderer
  1954   – Jack Blades, American singer-songwriter and bass player 
1955 – Marion Caspers-Merk, German politician
  1955   – John de Mol Jr., Dutch businessman, co-founded Endemol
  1955   – Eamon Gilmore, Irish trade union leader and politician, 25th Tánaiste of Ireland
  1955   – Margaret Moran, British politician and criminal
  1955   – Guy Nève, Belgian race car driver (d. 1992)
  1955   – Michael O'Keefe, American actor
  1955   – Bill Osborne, New Zealand rugby player
1956 – James A. Winnefeld, Jr., American admiral
1957 – Nazir Ahmed, Baron Ahmed, Pakistani-English businessman and politician
1958 – Brian Paddick, English police officer and politician
1959 – Paula Yates, British-Australian television host and author (d. 2000)
1961 – Andrew Murrison, English physician and politician, Minister for International Security Strategy
1962 – Clemens Binninger, German politician
  1962   – Stuart Pearce, English footballer, coach, and manager
  1962   – Steve Roach, Australian rugby league player, coach, and sportscaster
1963 – Paula Frazer, American singer-songwriter and guitarist 
  1963   – Billy Gould, American bass player, songwriter, and producer
  1963   – Mano Solo, French singer-songwriter, guitarist, and producer (d. 2010)
1964 – Helga Arendt, German sprinter (d. 2013)
  1964   – Cedric the Entertainer, American comedian, actor, and producer
  1964   – Djimon Hounsou, Beninese-American actor and producer
  1964   – Witold Smorawiński, Polish guitarist, composer, and educator
1965 – Jeff Jackson, Canadian ice hockey player and manager
1966 – Pierre Brassard, Canadian comedian and actor
  1966   – Alessandro Costacurta, Italian footballer, coach, and manager
  1966   – David Usher, English-Canadian singer-songwriter 
1967 – Dino Rađa, Croatian basketball player
  1967   – Omar Vizquel, Venezuelan-American baseball player and coach
1968 – Aidan Gillen, Irish actor
  1968   – Todd Jones, American baseball player
  1968   – Roxanna Panufnik, English composer
  1968   – Hashim Thaçi, Kosovan soldier and politician, 5th Prime Minister of Kosovo
1969 – Elias Atmatsidis, Greek footballer
  1969   – Rory McCann, Scottish actor
  1969   – Eilidh Whiteford, Scottish academic and politician
1970 – Damien Fleming, Australian cricketer, coach, and sportscaster
1971 – Kumar Dharmasena, Sri Lankan cricketer and umpire
  1971   – Mauro Pawlowski, Belgian singer-songwriter and guitarist
1972 – Rab Douglas, Scottish footballer
  1972   – Chipper Jones, American baseball player
  1972   – Jure Košir, Slovenian skier and singer
1973 – Gabby Logan, English gymnast, television and radio host
  1973   – Damon Lindelof, American screenwriter and producer
  1973   – Brian Marshall, American bass player and songwriter 
  1973   – Eric Snow, American basketball player and coach
  1973   – Sachin Tendulkar, Indian cricketer
  1973   – Toomas Tohver, Estonian footballer
  1973   – Lee Westwood, English golfer
1974 – Eric Kripke, American director, producer, and screenwriter
  1974   – Stephen Wiltshire, English illustrator 
1975 – Dejan Savić, Yugoslavian and Serbian water polo player 
1976 – Steve Finnan, Irish international footballer
  1976   – Frédéric Niemeyer, Canadian tennis player and coach
1977 – Carlos Beltrán, Puerto Rican-American baseball player
  1977   – Diego Placente, Argentine footballer
1978 – Diego Quintana, Argentine footballer
1980 – Fernando Arce, Mexican footballer
  1980   – Karen Asrian, Armenian chess player (d. 2008)
1981 – Taylor Dent, American tennis player
  1981   – Yuko Nakanishi, Japanese swimmer
1982 – Kelly Clarkson, American singer-songwriter, talk show host
  1982   – David Oliver, American hurdler
  1982   – Simon Tischer, German volleyball player
1983 – Hanna Melnychenko, Ukrainian heptathlete
1985 – Mike Rodgers, American sprinter
1986 – Aaron Cunningham, American baseball player
1987 – Ben Howard, English singer-songwriter and guitarist
  1987   – Kris Letang, Canadian ice hockey player
  1987   – Rein Taaramäe, Estonian cyclist
  1987   – Jan Vertonghen, Belgian international footballer
  1987   – Varun Dhawan, Indian actor
1989 – Elīna Babkina, Latvian basketball player
  1989   – David Boudia, American diver
  1989   – Taja Mohorčič, Slovenian tennis player
1990 – Kim Tae-ri, South Korean actress
  1990   – Jan Veselý, Czech basketball player
1991 – Sigrid Agren, French-Swedish model
  1991   – Morgan Ciprès, French figure skater
  1991   – Batuhan Karadeniz, Turkish footballer
1992 – Joe Keery, American actor
  1992   – Laura Kenny, English cyclist
1993 – Ben Davies, Welsh international footballer
1994 – Jordan Fisher, American singer, dancer, and actor 
  1994   – Caspar Lee, British-South African Youtuber
1996 – Ashleigh Barty, Australian tennis player
1997 – Lydia Ko, New Zealand golfer
  1997   – Veronika Kudermetova, Russian tennis player
1998 – Ryan Newman, American actress
1999 – Jerry Jeudy, American football player
2002 – Olivia Gadecki, Australian tennis player

Deaths

Pre-1600
 624 – Mellitus, saint and archbishop of Canterbury
1149 – Petronille de Chemillé, abbess of Fontevrault
1288 – Gertrude of Austria (b. 1226)
1338 – Theodore I, Marquess of Montferrat (b. 1291)
1479 – Jorge Manrique, Spanish poet (b. 1440)
1513 – Şehzade Ahmet, Ottoman prince (b. 1465)

1601–1900
1617 – Concino Concini, Italian-French politician, Prime Minister of France (b. 1575)
1622 – Fidelis of Sigmaringen, German friar and saint (b. 1577)
1656 – Thomas Fincke, Danish mathematician and physicist (b. 1561)
1692 – Johannes Zollikofer, Swiss vicar (b. 1633)
1731 – Daniel Defoe, English journalist, novelist, and spy (b. 1660)
1748 – Anton thor Helle, German-Estonian clergyman and translator (b. 1683)
1779 – Eleazar Wheelock, American minister and academic, founded Dartmouth College (b. 1711)
1794 – Axel von Fersen the Elder, Swedish field marshal and politician (b. 1719)
1852 – Vasily Zhukovsky, Russian poet and translator (b. 1783)
1889 – Zulma Carraud, French author (b. 1796)
1891 – Helmuth von Moltke the Elder, German field marshal (b. 1800)

1901–present
1924 – G. Stanley Hall, American psychologist and academic (b. 1844)
1931 – David Kldiashvili, Georgian author and playwright (b. 1862)
1935 – Anastasios Papoulas, Greek general (b. 1857)
1938 – George Grey Barnard, American sculptor (b. 1863)
1939 – Louis Trousselier, French cyclist (b. 1881)
1941 – Karin Boye, Swedish author and poet (b. 1900)
1942 – Lucy Maud Montgomery, Canadian author (b. 1874)
1944 – Charles Jordan, American magician (b. 1888)
1945 – Ernst-Robert Grawitz, German physician (b. 1899)
1947 – Hans Biebow, German SS officer (b. 1902)
  1947   – Willa Cather, American novelist, short story writer, and poet (b. 1873)
1948 – Jāzeps Vītols, Latvian composer (b. 1863)
1954 – Guy Mairesse, French racing driver (b. 1910)
1960 – Max von Laue, German physicist and academic, Nobel Prize laureate (b. 1879)
1961 – Lee Moran, American actor, director and screenwriter (b. 1888)
1962 – Milt Franklyn, American composer (b. 1897)
1964 – Gerhard Domagk, German pathologist and bacteriologist (b. 1895)
1965 – Louise Dresser, American actress (b. 1878)
1966 – Simon Chikovani, Georgian poet and author (b. 1902)
1967 – Vladimir Komarov, Russian pilot, engineer, and cosmonaut (b. 1927)
  1967   – Robert Richards, Australian politician, 32nd Premier of South Australia (b. 1885)
1968 – Walter Tewksbury, American athlete (b. 1876)
1970 – Otis Spann, American singer and pianist (b. 1930)
1972 – Fernando Amorsolo, Filipino painter (b. 1892)
1974 – Bud Abbott, American comedian and producer (b. 1895)
1976 – Mark Tobey, American-Swiss painter and educator (b. 1890)
1980 – Alejo Carpentier, Swiss-Cuban musicologist and author (b. 1904)
1982 – Ville Ritola, Finnish runner (b. 1896)
1983 – Erol Güngör, Turkish sociologist, psychologist, and academic (b. 1938)
  1983   – Rolf Stommelen, German racing driver (b. 1943)
1984 – Rafael Pérez y Pérez, Spanish author (b. 1891)
1986 – Wallis Simpson, American socialite, Duchess of Windsor (b. 1896)
1993 – Oliver Tambo, South African lawyer and activist (b. 1917)
  1993   – Tran Duc Thao, Vietnamese philosopher and theorist (b. 1917)
1995 – Lodewijk Bruckman, Dutch painter (b. 1903)
1997 – Allan Francovich, American director and producer (b. 1941)
  1997   – Pat Paulsen, American comedian and activist (b. 1927)
  1997   – Eugene Stoner, American engineer, designed the AR-15 rifle (b. 1922)
2001 – Josef Peters, German racing driver (b. 1914)
  2001   – Johnny Valentine, American wrestler (b. 1928)
2002 – Lucien Wercollier, Luxembourgian sculptor (b. 1908)
2003 – Nüzhet Gökdoğan, Turkish astronomer and mathematician (b. 1910)
2004 – José Giovanni, French-Swiss director and producer (b. 1923)
  2004   – Estée Lauder, American businesswoman, co-founded Estée Lauder Companies (b. 1906)
2005 – Ezer Weizman, Israeli general and politician, 7th President of Israel (b. 1924)
  2005   – Fei Xiaotong, Chinese sociologist and academic (b. 1910)
2006 – Brian Labone, English footballer (b. 1940)
  2006   – Moshe Teitelbaum, Romanian-American rabbi and author (b. 1914)
2008 – Jimmy Giuffre, American clarinet player, and saxophonist, and composer (b. 1921)
2011 – Sathya Sai Baba, Indian guru and philanthropist (b. 1926)
2014 – Hans Hollein, Austrian architect, designed Haas House (b. 1934)
  2014   – Sandy Jardine, Scottish footballer and manager (b. 1948)
  2014   – Shobha Nagi Reddy, Indian politician (b. 1968)
  2014   – Tadeusz Różewicz, Polish poet and playwright (b. 1921)
2015 – Władysław Bartoszewski, Polish journalist and politician, Polish Minister of Foreign Affairs (b. 1922)
2016 – Tommy Kono, American weightlifter and coach (b. 1930)
2017 – Robert Pirsig, American author and philosopher (b. 1928)
2022 – Andrew Woolfolk, American saxophonist (b. 1950)

Holidays and observances
Armenian Genocide Remembrance Day (Armenia, France)
Christian feast day:
Benedict Menni
Dermot of Armagh
Dyfnan of Anglesey
Ecgberht of Ripon
Fidelis of Sigmaringen
Gregory of Elvira
Ivo of Ramsey
Johann Walter (Lutheran)
Mary of Clopas
Mary Euphrasia Pelletier
Mellitus
Peter of Saint Joseph de Betancur
Salome (disciple)
Wilfrid (Church of England)
William Firmatus
April 24 (Eastern Orthodox liturgics)
Concord Day (Niger)
Democracy Day (Nepal)
Fashion Revolution Day, and its related observances: 
Labour Safety Day (Bangladesh, proposed)
National Panchayati Raj Day (India)
Republic Day (The Gambia)
World Day for Laboratory Animals

References

External links

 BBC: On This Day
 
 Historical Events on April 24

Days of the year
April